The Cleveland Cavaliers (also known simply as the Cavs) are an American professional basketball team based in Cleveland, Ohio. They began playing in the National Basketball Association (NBA) in 1970. This list summarizes the team's season-by-season records, including post-season, and includes select season-end awards won by the team's players and/or coaches.  The Cavaliers were founded in 1970 as an expansion franchise and since their first season, they have always played in the Central Division and the Eastern Conference.

On October 14, 1970, the Cavs lost to the Buffalo Braves 92–107 in their first game. They have been awarded the first overall draft pick six times, choosing Austin Carr (1971), Brad Daugherty (1986), LeBron James (2003), Kyrie Irving (2011), Anthony Bennett (2013) and Andrew Wiggins (2014). In his last season with the Cavs, Austin Carr won the J. Walter Kennedy Citizenship Award, the first of four Cavaliers to win the award (Eric Snow, Luol Deng and LeBron James won the award in 2005, 2014 and 2017, respectively). As a Cavalier, LeBron won Rookie of the Year as well as two MVP awards and two All Star Game MVP awards. He also led the Cavaliers to five NBA Finals, including the last 4 straight, and won the 2016 title as Finals MVP. Cleveland's next first overall pick after James, Kyrie Irving, won Rookie of the Year in 2012 and NBA All-Star Game MVP in 2014.

In their 48 seasons, the Cavs have achieved a winning record 23 times. Highlights include 20 playoff appearances, which included winning the Central Division championship seven times (1975–76, 2008–09, 2009–10, 2014–15, 2015–16, 2016–17, and 2017–18), winning the Eastern Conference championship five times (2006–07, 2014–15, 2015–16, 2016–17, and 2017–18), and winning the NBA Title in 2016. In five straight playoff appearances with LeBron James in his first tenure with Cleveland, the Cavs won more playoff games than they lost each season, something they only ever managed, barely, once before, in the 1991–92 season. Overall, their winning percentage through the years is .456, with 1660 wins and 1967 losses in regular season play (as of March 13, 2015). They are 84–84 in the playoffs, a winning percentage of .500. Cleveland's 2016 championship meant that the Eastern Conference's Central Division is the only current NBA division with more than three of its five franchises having won NBA titles (Cleveland joined Chicago, Detroit, and Milwaukee as teams with at least one championship).

Key

Seasons

All-time records

Notes

References
General

Specific

 
seasons